The 2007 North Carolina Tar Heels football team represented the University of North Carolina at Chapel Hill as a member of Coastal Division of the Atlantic Coast Conference (ACC) during the 2007 NCAA Division I FBS football season. Led by first-year head coach Butch Davis, the Tar Heels played their home games at Kenan Memorial Stadium in Chapel Hill, North Carolina. North Carolina finished the season 4–8 overall and 3–5 in ACC play to place fourth in the Coastal Division.

Previous season

The 2006 North Carolina football team began with the Tar Heels unranked in the AP and coaches' preseason polls. Despite the fact that they were receiving little national attention, there was much optimism in the state of North Carolina.  The team got off to a shaky start losing six out of their first seven games.  Just days after playing their seventh game of the season, a 23–0 loss to Virginia in Charlottesville, the University of North Carolina announced that head coach John Bunting would be relieved of his duties at the conclusion of the season."  After the announcement of Bunting's firing the team arguably became much more competitive and won their last two games of the season, 23–9 against NC State and 45–44 against Duke.

Preseason
Immediately after Bunting's firing on October 22, 2006 there was much speculation over who North Carolina would name their new football coach. Rumors immediately started to circulate that former head coach of the Cleveland Browns and the Miami Hurricanes, Butch Davis, was interested in the position." Athletic director Dick Baddour confirmed the accuracy of the rumors when he announced on November 13, 2006 that Butch Davis had agreed to become the new head football coach."
Soon after his hiring, Butch Davis began to assemble his coaching staff. He was able to lure offensive coordinator John Shoop and defensive coordinator Chuck Pagano from the Oakland Raiders of the National Football League (NFL), and defensive line coach John Blake from Nebraska. Blake is regarded by many to be one of the best recruiters in all of college football."

As of March 2007 many publications began releasing preseason rankings for the upcoming football season. Although UNC still ranked in the lower tier of the Atlantic Coast Conference, many publications were impressed with the Tar Heels' hiring of Butch Davis and their top ranked recruiting class."

Recruiting
The Tar Heels received 20 letters of intent on National Signing Day, February 7, 2007. Three student athletes had already enrolled before National Signing Day making this class relatively large with 23 commitments.

Coaching staff

Schedule

Team statistics

References

North Carolina
North Carolina Tar Heels football seasons
North Carolina Tar Heels football